"If There's Any Justice" is a song by written by Michael Noble, C. Michael Spriggs and Tony Colton, and recorded by American country music artist Lee Greenwood.  It was released in August 1987 as the second single and title track from the album If There's Any Justice.  The song reached number 9 on the Billboard Hot Country Singles & Tracks chart.

Chart performance

References

1987 singles
1987 songs
Lee Greenwood songs
Song recordings produced by Jimmy Bowen
MCA Records singles
Songs written by Tony Colton